Hexacraspis is a genus of flies in the family Stratiomyidae.

Distribution
South Africa.

Species
Hexacraspis sexspinosa Macquart, 1846

References

Stratiomyidae
Brachycera genera
Taxa named by Günther Enderlein
Diptera of Africa
Endemic fauna of South Africa